Liu Shengshu (born 8 April 2004) is a Chinese badminton player. She is the reigning World Junior champion in both the women's and mixed doubles categories.

Achievements

World Junior Championships 
Girls' doubles

Mixed doubles

BWF World Tour (1 title)
The BWF World Tour, which was announced on 19 March 2017 and implemented in 2018, is a series of elite badminton tournaments sanctioned by the Badminton World Federation (BWF). The BWF World Tour is divided into levels of World Tour Finals, Super 1000, Super 750, Super 500, Super 300 (part of the BWF World Tour), and the BWF Tour Super 100.

Women's doubles

BWF International Challenge/Series (1 title) 
Women's doubles

  BWF International Challenge tournament
  BWF International Series tournament

BWF Junior International (2 titles) 
Girls' doubles

Mixed doubles

  BWF Junior International Grand Prix tournament
  BWF Junior International Challenge tournament
  BWF Junior International Series tournament
  BWF Junior Future Series tournament

References

External links 

2004 births
Living people
Badminton players from Liaoning
Chinese female badminton players
21st-century Chinese women